José Luis Llorente Gento (born 6 January 1959 in Valladolid, Spain) is a Spanish retired basketball player. He played 112 matches for the Spain national team.

Clubs
 1979-83: Real Madrid
 1983-85: Cajamadrid
 1985-87: CB Zaragoza
 1987-92: Real Madrid
 1992-96: BC Andorra
 1996-97: Baloncesto Fuenlabrada

Awards
Liga ACB (2): 1979-80, 1981–82
Copa del Rey (1): 1988-89
Euroleague (1): 1979-80
Intercontinental Cup (1): 1981
Korać Cup (1): 1987-88
Saporta Cup (2): 1988-89, 1991–92
Summer Olympics - Silver Medal 1984

References
 ACB profile

1959 births
Living people
Spanish men's basketball players
Liga ACB players
Real Madrid Baloncesto players
Baloncesto Fuenlabrada players
Point guards
Sportspeople from Valladolid
Basketball players at the 1980 Summer Olympics
Basketball players at the 1984 Summer Olympics
Basketball players at the 1988 Summer Olympics
Olympic basketball players of Spain
Olympic silver medalists for Spain
Olympic medalists in basketball
BC Andorra players
Spanish expatriate basketball people in Andorra
CB Zaragoza players
Medalists at the 1984 Summer Olympics
Gento family
20th-century Spanish people
21st-century Spanish people